Live! is the first live album by guitarist Frank Gambale, released in 1989 by Legato Records and reissued in 2000 by Wombat Records.

Track listing

Personnel

Frank Gambale – guitar, mixing, producer
Kei Akagi – keyboard
Joe Heredia – drums
Steve Kershisnik – bass
Steve Tavaglione – saxophone, EWI

Technical
John Falzarano – engineering
Ray Thompson – engineering
Robert M. Biles – mixing
Jeff Sanders – mastering
Mark Varney – executive producer

References

External links
In Review: Frank Gambale "Live!" at Guitar Nine Records

Frank Gambale albums
1989 live albums